Lithodes is a genus of king crabs. Today there are about 30 recognized species, but others formerly included in this genus have been moved to Neolithodes and Paralomis. They are restricted to relatively cold waters, meaning that they only occur at high depths at low latitudes, but some species also shallower at high latitudes. They are medium to large crabs and some species are or were targeted by fisheries.

Species
Lithodes contains the following species:

Lithodes aequispinus Benedict, 1895 – golden king crab
Lithodes aotearoa Ahyong, 2010
Lithodes australiensis Ahyong, 2010
Lithodes ceramensis Takeda & Nagai, 2004
Lithodes chaddertoni Ahyong, 2010
Lithodes confundens Macpherson, 1988
Lithodes couesi J. E. Benedict, 1895 – scarlet king crab
Lithodes ferox Filhol, 1885 – fierce king crab
Lithodes formosae Ahyong & Chan, 2010
Lithodes galapagensis Hall & Thatje, 2009
Lithodes jessica Ahyong, 2010
Lithodes longispina Sakai, 1971
Lithodes macquariae Ahyong, 2010
Lithodes maja (Linnaeus, 1758) – Norway king crab
Lithodes mamillifer manningi Macpherson, 1988
Lithodes manningi Macpherson, 1988
Lithodes megacantha Macpherson, 1991
Lithodes murrayi Henderson, 1888 – Subantarctic stone crab
Lithodes nintokuae Sakai, 1976
Lithodes panamensis Faxon, 1893
Lithodes paulayi Macpherson & Chan, 2008
Lithodes rachelae Ahyong, 2010
Lithodes richeri Macpherson, 1990
Lithodes robertsoni Ahyong, 2010
Lithodes santolla (Molina, 1782) – southern king crab, Chilean king crab, centolla
Lithodes turkayi Macpherson, 1988
Lithodes turritus Ortmann, 1892
Lithodes unicornis Macpherson, 1984
Lithodes wiracocha Haig, 1974

References

King crabs
Decapod genera